Bricks and Blackouts is an album by the American punk rock band Gaunt, released in 1998. The album was not promoted by Warner Brothers Records, due to huge layoffs in their marketing division. It was Gaunt's final album; in January 2001, frontman Jerry Wick died while riding his bike.

Production
The album was produced in part by Brian Paulson. It was recorded at Pachyderm Studio, in Cannon Falls, Minnesota.

Critical reception

The Chicago Reader thought that "the shrieking rage that fueled the earlier records has either dissipated or been groomed away; if Bricks and Blackouts achieves nothing else, perhaps it will dispel the pernicious myth that Warner Brothers is an artist-friendly label." CMJ New Music Monthly opined that Gaunt possessed "an innate understanding that copies nothing but examines various elements, in the process creating something hard, passionate and timeless." The Plain Dealer declared that Gaunt "may tear through short songs like punks with no tomorrow, but their attention to melodic detail bears the unavoidable influence of the mainstream rock that rules the airwaves in [the Midwest]."

The Fort Lauderdale Sun-Sentinel wrote: "Recycling AC/DC riffs through a squall of digital noise—modem beeps and so forth—Gaunt counts up suburbia's casualties in the information age." The Washington Post called the album "excellent," writing that Wick "writes fast, melodic, punchy songs in the tradition of the Saints and Superchunk." Miami New Times thought that "'Mixed Metals' and 'Don't Tell' chart the remarkable growth of Gaunt as a band and Wick as one of the underground's best songwriters."

AllMusic wrote that the album "has a shaky foundation and too many songwriting and production lapses to complete its potential."

Track listing

References

1998 albums
Warner Records albums
Punk rock albums by American artists